WQCP (91.1 MHz) is a non-commercial FM radio station broadcasting a classical music radio format. It is licensed to Fort Pierce, Florida, and serves the Treasure Coast. It is part of IRSC Public Media, a division of Indian River State College, alongside two other stations: WQCS 88.9 FM in Fort Pierce and WQJS 88.5 FM in Clewiston.

History
Black Media Works, Inc., launched this station as WJFP on January 15, 1995. Under Black Media Works, the station broadcast urban gospel music in the mornings and midday, with hip hop, R&B and urban contemporary music in the afternoons through late night. There was also a Sunday night block of specialty programs for the region's Haitian community. The original studios, a former bail bondsman's office in a converted house on Orange Avenue, until the owners wished to use it for their business again, at which time WJFP relocated across Fort Pierce to a site on US 1. Translators were also built to expand the station's signal to key areas with large Black and Haitian populations.

In August 2021, Indian River State College announced it had reached a deal to purchase WJFP and its Clewiston satellite WJCB to provide a second frequency and split NPR news/talk and classical music programming in the Fort Pierce area. On September 14, 2021, the final live show aired, the Drive Time Show with Jumpin' Joe, with guests on air and by phone including now-former station owner and president of Black Media Works Kim Kassis (Special K), DJ One Shot, Shaneiac, Melan from the T-Babby Radio Show, DJ T-Black, a few of the pastors from WJFP, and others. The final song on the show was "We Are The World," by USA For Africa. 

On September 14, 2021, by 6:00 p.m., the live online stream was taken down and the translators in Brevard County on 94.3 FM and 93.9 FM had gone silent. The next day, music continued to play through the night with R&B, hip hop, pop, disco, oldies, jazz, and some Christian music, switching to gospel music from 5:00 a.m. until the final song aired just before 8:00 a.m. 

On September 15 at 8:00 a.m., classic hits 88.9 HD3 "The River" began simulcasting on 91.1 and 88.5 temporarily until the new services launched with new call letters on September 28. The programming on WQJS is heard in Fort Pierce on the HD2 subchannel of WQCS.

The purchase of the two stations by Indian River State College was consummated on September 27, 2021, at a price of $950,000.

Translators
Black Media Works owned two translators in Brevard County that previously rebroadcast this station. The Mangonia Park translator, covering West Palm Beach, switched program sources to a subchannel of WLLY-FM in 2018 and became its own station, "Yo 107.1".

References

External links
 

QCP
Fort Pierce, Florida
Radio stations established in 1995
Classical music radio stations in the United States
NPR member stations
1995 establishments in Florida
Indian River State College